Hajjiabad (also Romanized as Ḩājjīābād and Hājīabād; also known as Ḩājābād) is a village in Sedeh Rural District, Sedeh District, Eqlid County, Fars Province, Iran. At the 2006 census, its population was 374, in 77 families.

References 

Populated places in Eqlid County